The Premiership Rugby Cup is an English rugby union knockout cup competition for teams in Premiership Rugby. It was created in 2018 to replace the Anglo-Welsh Cup after the withdrawal of the Welsh regions.

History
The Premiership Rugby Cup was created to replace the Anglo-Welsh Cup which had been running since 2005 when the Welsh regions joined the then English-only Powergen Cup. In the 2017–18 Anglo-Welsh Cup, all four of the Welsh regions finished bottom of their pools. In May 2018, the Welsh Rugby Union announced that they were going to be setting up a Welsh under-23s competition for their regions and would thus be unable to commit to Anglo-Welsh Cup games. Premiership Rugby Limited, which organises the English top flight, then announced that the Anglo-Welsh Cup would be replaced by the Premiership Rugby Cup, which would be solely for the English Premiership clubs. The Cup was created to continue to allow younger English Premiership players to compete in more matches at Premiership stadia.

The 2020–21 tournament was cancelled due to the effects of the COVID-19 pandemic.

Format
The format for the competition until 2019–20 consisted of the twelve Premiership teams grouped into three pools of four with at least one club having one local derby match in their groups. The matches were typically held over either the Autumn International or Rugby World Cup and Six Nations Championship weekends. The three pool winners and the best runner-up entered the semi-finals with home advantage given to the team with the better record in the pool stage and the final would be held at the home of the highest ranked club. The winning club received £500,000.

Finals

List of champions

* 1982 title shared between Gloucester and Moseley.

See also
 Premiership
 Anglo-Welsh Cup
 RFU Knockout Cup
 Championship Cup
 RFU Intermediate Cup
 RFU Senior Vase
 RFU Junior Vase
 Rugby union in England

References

Notes

External links
 

Rugby union competitions in England
Rugby union cup competitions in England
Cup
Recurring sporting events established in 2018